Genco Ecer (born 13 December 1985) is a Turkish Cypriot singer and athlete. Prior to his music career, Ecer represented Northern Cyprus in its national basketball and swimming team. In 2009, Ecer released his debut album Kandıramazsın. The album is a blend of R&B, funky house, and pop. He gained success with his single "U Dönüşü".

Biography
Ecer was born in Ankara, Turkey to an Ankara-native mother and a Turkish Cypriot father. At a young age he moved with his family to Cyprus. He spent his secondary education at the Bayraktar Türk Maarif Koleji and then the Türk Maarif Koleji. Ecer also studied architecture at the Near East University.

Discography

Studio albums 
Kandıramazsın (2009)

Singles 
"U Dönüşü" (2009)
"Yalvarırım" (2011)
"Vur" (2017)
"Zor Kurtarmışım" (2018)
"Kalp Kıranlara" (2019)
"Yarım Kalan" (feat. Oneblood) (2020)
"Oluruna Bıraktım" (2020)
"Nerede Bu?" (2020)
"Legal" (2021)
"Konu O Olunca" (with İrem Derici) (2021)
"Karma" (with Ece Seçkin and Anıl Piyancı) (2022)

References

External links
Official Website
Genco Ecer at Discogs

1985 births
Living people
Turkish people of Cypriot descent
21st-century Cypriot male singers
Turkish Cypriot singers
Türk Maarif Koleji alumni
21st-century Turkish male singers
Near East University alumni
People from Ankara
Turkish emigrants to Cyprus
Turkish Cypriot sportspeople